Chlanidota is a genus of sea snails, marine gastropod mollusks in the family Buccinidae, the true whelks.

Species
Species within the genus Chlanidota include:
 Chlanidota anomala Kantor & Harasewych, 2008
 Chlanidota chordata (Strebel, 1908)
 Chlanidota densesculpta (Martens, 1885)
 Chlanidota invenusta Harasewych & Kantor, 1999
 Chlanidota palliata Strebel, 1908
 Chlanidota paucispiralis Powell, 1951
 Chlanidota pilosa Powell, 1951
 Chlanidota signeyana Powell, 1951
 Chlanidota vestita (Martens, 1878)
Species brought into synonymy
 Chlanidota bisculpta Dell, 1990: synonym of Parabuccinum bisculptum (Dell, 1990) (original combination)
 Chlanidota elongata Lamy, 1910: synonym of Chlanidota signeyana Powell, 1951
 Chlanidota eltanini Dell, 1990: synonym of Parabuccinum eltanini (Dell, 1990) (original combination)
 Chlanidota lamyi Dell, 1990: synonym of Chlanidota signeyana Powell, 1951
 Chlanidota modesta (Martens, 1885): synonym of Chlanidotella modesta (Martens, 1885)
 Chlanidota polyspeira Dell, 1990: synonym of Parabuccinum polyspeirum (Dell, 1990) (original combination)
 Chlanidota pyriformis Dell, 1990: synonym of Chlanidota signeyana Powell, 1951
 Chlanidota smithi Powell, 1958: synonym of Neobuccinum eatoni (E. A. Smith, 1875)

References

External links
 Martens, E. von. (1878). Conchylien aus den kälteren Meeresgegenden der südlichen Erdhälfte. Sitzungs-Berichte der Gesellschaft Naturforschender Freunde zu Berlin. 1878: 20-26.

Buccinidae
Gastropod genera